The Soghain were a people of ancient Ireland. The 17th-century scholar Dubhaltach Mac Fhirbhisigh identified them as part of a larger group called the Cruithin. Mac Fhirbhisigh stated that the Cruithin included "the Dál Araidhi [Dál nAraidi], the seven Lóigisi [Loígis] of Leinster, the seven Soghain of Ireland, and every Conaille that is in Ireland."

Locations

The locations of four of the seven Soghain are as follows:
 A branch in the territory of Fernmag (barony of Farney, County Monaghan).
 In Delvin (County Westmeath) where a Soghain tribe lived with a branch of the Delbhna in an area called Trícha cét na Delbna Móire agus na Sogan.
 The Corcu Shogain, who were subject to the Benntraige under the Eoghanacht. An Ogham inscription discovered near Aglish in the barony of East Muskerry, some twelve miles west of the city of Cork, displays the words MUCOI SOGINI, which probably means "of the Corcu Sogain". 
 The Soghain of Connacht were located in central east County Galway, in a kingdom called Soghan.

Soghan

The Soghain of Connacht were located in the ancient kingdom of Soghan, an area in central east County Galway bounded by the river Suck on the east, the river Clare on the west, the Grange and Shiven rivers to the north, and the Raford and Ballinure rivers to the south. A poem recorded in The Book of Uí Maine, Cruas Connacht clanna Sogain, lists the kingdom's boundaries, which can be found to tie in with the above locations:

From Áth an Ibar west
To Glais Uair Arnaigh
Was the extent of Soghan
That sword-guarded land.

From Béal na Róbe in Máenmagh
To the clear, soft-reeded Simin
Was the breath of the plain
Which bore no ignominy.

The previous, pre-Gaelic people of the area were called the Senchineoil. Very little information survives on them.

The Soghain of Connacht were described by Seán Mór Ó Dubhagáin in his poem Triallam timcheall na Fodla as follows: "The six Sogain let us not shun / Their kings are without oblivion / Good the host of plundering excursions / To whom the spear-armed Sogain is hereditary."

The Book of Lecan lists their six branches as Cenél Rechta, Cenél Trena, Cenél Luchta, Cenél Fergna, Cenél Domaingen and Cenél Déigill.

The genealogy of Saint Kerrill of Clonkeenkerrill is given as Caireall mac Curnáin mac Treana mac Fionnchada mac Náir mac Earca mac Tiobraide mac Soghain Salbhuidhe mac Fiacha Araidhe. His grandfather, Treana mac Fionnchada, was the eponym of the Cinel Trena, who were apparently located close to Knockma, as evinced by the placename Tír Mhic Trena (the land of the sons of Trena). This area was the western limit of the kingdom of the Connacht Soghain.

Early Christian evangelists among the Soghain included Conainne, St Connell and Kerrill. Their successors include Naomhéid, Cuana of Kilcoonagh, Dubhán, Felig, Íbar, Íomar of the Sogain, Laisren of Clonkeenkerrill, Maol Chosna, Modiúit, Menott, Molua of Kilmoluagh.

Parishes known to be included in Soghan were:

 Abbeyknockmoy
 Abbert / Monivea
 Ahascragh
 Athenry
 Ballymacward
 Clonkeenkerrill
 Fohenagh
 Kilcloony
 Kilconnell
 Kilgerrill
 Killascobe
 Killosolan
 Kilmoylan (part)
 Lackagh (part)
 Moylough

Soghan became subject to the Uí Maine sometime during the first millennium.

Descendants

Descendants of the Soghain are still found in great numbers in County Galway, bearing names such as Ó Mainnín, Mannion, Manning, Ward / Mac an Bhaird, Gill / Gillane, Scarry, Dugan / Duggan, Megan / McGann, Martin, and Cassain.

Annalistic references

 811. Irghalach, son of Maelumha, lord of Corca Soghain

See also

 Clann Fhergail
 Uí Fiachrach Aidhne
 Clann Taidg
 Conmhaícne Mara
 Delbhna Tir Dha Locha
 Maolán
 Muintir Murchada
 Trícha Máenmaige
 Uí Díarmata
 Cóiced Ol nEchmacht
 Síol Anmchadha
 Maigh Seola
 Cenél Áeda na hEchtge

References
 The Book of Uí Maine, otherwise called 'The book of the O'Kellys''', R.A.S. Mac Alister (ed.), Dublin, 1942. 
 Punann arsa part i, Martin Finnerty, Galway, 1951.
 The parish of Ballinasloe, Rev. Patrick K. Egan, Dublin and London, 1960. Facsimile reproduction, Galway, 1994. 
 Ballymacward: The story of an east Galway parish, John S. Flynn, 1991. 
 The Life, Legends and Legacy of Saint Kerrill: A Fifth-Century East Galway Evangelist, Joseph Mannion, 2004. 0 954798 1 3
 The true identity of Saint Kerrill of Clonkeenkerrill, Joseph Mannion, in Making shapes with slates and marla:A Gurteen anthology, John and Margaret Corbett (compilers), Galway, 2004. 
 The Senchineoil and the Sogain: Differentiating between the pre-Celtic and early Celtic Tribes of Central East Galway, Joseph Mannion, Journal of the Galway Archaeological and Historical Society'', Volume 58, pp. 165–170, 2006.

Connacht
Historical Celtic peoples
Geography of County Galway
History of County Galway
Tribes of ancient Ireland
Ulaid